Nova is an American science documentary television series produced by WGBH Boston for PBS. Many of the programs in this list were not originally produced for PBS, but were acquired from other sources such as the BBC. All acquired programs are edited for Nova, if only to provide American English narration and additional voice of interpreters (translating from another language).
Most of the episodes aired in a 60-minute time slot.

In 2005, Nova began airing some episodes titled NOVA scienceNOW, which followed a newsmagazine style format. For two seasons, NOVA scienceNOW episodes aired in the same time slot as Nova. In 2008, NOVA scienceNOW was officially declared its own series and given its own time slot. Therefore, NOVA scienceNOW episodes are not included in this list.


Season 1: 1974

Season 2: 1974–1975

Season 3: 1976

Season 4: 1977

Season 5: 1978

Season 6: 1979

Season 7: 1979–1980

Season 8: 1980–1981

Season 9: 1981–1982

Season 10: 1982–1983

Season 11: 1983–1984

Season 12: 1984–1985

Season 13: 1985–1986

Season 14: 1986–1987

Season 15: 1987–1988

Season 16: 1988–1989

Season 17: 1989–1990

Season 18: 1990–1991

Season 19: 1991–1992

Season 20: 1992–1993

Season 21: 1993–1994

Season 22: 1994–1995

Season 23: 1995–1996

Season 24: 1996–1997

Season 25: 1997–1998

Season 26: 1998–1999

Season 27: 1999–2000

Season 28: 2000–2001

Season 29: 2001–2002

Season 30: 2002–2003

Season 31: 2003–2004

Season 32: 2004–2005

Season 33: 2005–2006

Season 34: 2006–2007

Season 35: 2007–2008

Season 36: 2008–2009

Season 37: 2009–2010

Season 38: 2010–2011

Season 39: 2011–2012

Season 40: 2012–2013

Season 41: 2013–2014

Season 42: 2014–2015

Season 43: 2015–2016

Season 44: 2016–2017

Season 45: 2017–2018

Season 46: 2018–2019

Season 47: 2020

Season 48: 2021

Season 49: 2022

Season 50: 2023

References

Sources

 "Nova – Past Television Programs". PBS. Retrieved on 20 December 2009
 "PBS.ORG Press Room". Retrieved on 22 February 2013
 "OpenVault from WGBH, Boston listings for Nova Episodes"

External links
 Official website
 

Episodes
 
Lists of American non-fiction television series episodes